The Albany Law Journal of Science and Technology (Bluebook abbreviation: Alb. L.J. Sci. & Tech.) is a triannual law journal edited by students at Albany Law School. It was established in 1990 and covers legal issues involving science and technology. The Volume 28 editor-in-chief is Anneliese Aliasso. The journal also organizes an annual symposia.

Membership 
Members are students at Albany Law School. Students become eligible for journal membership upon completion of their first year of law school. Offers of membership are extended based on student class standing or on the results of a writing competition jointly administered by the school's three student-edited journals.

Notable symposia 
 Facebook Firing: The Intersection of Social Media, Employment, & Ethics (2013)
 Building a High-Tech, 21st Century Economy (2015)

Past Editors-in-Chief 
 Vol. 33 - Claire Stratton (2023)
 Vol. 29 - Daniel Young (2019)
 Vol. 27 - Erin Ginty (2017)
 Vol. 26 - James Faucher II (2016)
 Vol. 25 - Gary J. Repke, Jr. (2015)
 Vol. 24 - Elizabeth A. Cappillino (2014)
 Vol. 23 - Nadia Isobel Arginteanu (2013)
 Vol. 22 - Christina M. French (2012)
 Vol. 21 - Caitlin Donovan (2011)
 Vol. 20 - Andrew Wilson (2010)
 Vol. 19 - William Q. Lowe (2009)

See also
 Albany Law Review
 Indian Journal of Law and Technology

References

External links 
 

American law journals
Law and public policy journals
Triannual journals
English-language journals
Publications established in 1990
Law journals edited by students
Science and law